County Route 522 (CR 522) is a county highway in the U.S. state of New Jersey. The highway extends  from Route 27 in South Brunswick Township to Main Street (CR 537) in Freehold Borough.

Route description

CR 522 begins at an intersection with Route 27 on the border of South Brunswick, Middlesex County and Franklin Township, Somerset County. Unsigned, it travels along the divided Promenade Boulevard where it provides access to numerous condominium developments. It crosses U.S. Route 1 (US 1) then passes through forested areas near a few residential subdivisions, turning southeast and passing over Amtrak's Northeast Corridor. Following the bridge, the route enters residential areas and intersects CR 681 and CR 697 before coming to an intersection with US 130. At this point, Promenade Boulevard ends and CR 522 turns south to form a concurrency with US 130 on a four-lane divided highway, passing businesses. CR 522 splits from US 130 at an interchange and heads east on two-lane undivided Ridge Road, running past several distribution warehouses and a couple farms. After passing over the New Jersey Turnpike (Interstate 95), the route continues to an intersection with CR 535.

At this point, the road enters Monroe Township and becomes Rhode Hall Road, passing through agricultural areas before turning south into wooded residential areas. CR 522 crosses into Jamesburg and reaches the CR 698 intersection, at which point the route heads southeast onto Gatzmer Avenue and passes under Conrail Shared Assets Operations' Amboy Secondary before crossing CR 615. At this point, CR 522 bears left onto Railroad Avenue and runs to the east of the Freehold Industrial Track railroad line operated by the Delaware and Raritan River Railroad through residential and commercial areas in the center of Jamesburg before forming a brief concurrency with CR 612 near Lake Manalapan. Past CR 612, the road continues southeast on Bucklew Avenue through neighborhoods before leaving Jamesburg for Monroe Township again. In this area, the route passes through a mix of woods and residential subdivisions, intersecting CR 614 and CR 613. At the intersection with the latter, the road becomes Jamesburg-Englishtown Road.

A short distance later, CR 522 enters Manalapan Township in Monmouth County and passes through wooded areas with some homes before entering Englishtown. In Englishtown, the route passes homes and turns east onto Water Street, reaching an intersection with CR 527. CR 522 turns south onto CR 527, and the two routes head south on Main Street past residences and businesses. CR 522 splits from CR 527 by turning east onto Tennent Avenue. The road crosses back into Manalapan Township and becomes Englishtown-Freehold Road, heading southeast past residential neighborhoods and a tract of Monmouth Battlefield State Park. After crossing CR 3 (Tennent Road), the route passes through fields and woods within Monmouth Battlefield State Park. Within the park, CR 522 crosses into Freehold Township and turns east, running immediately to the north of the Freehold Industrial Track. The road comes to an interchange with US 9, at which point CR 522 is briefly a four-lane divided highway. Past this interchange, the route heads into residential and commercial areas as a two-lane road. Upon entering Freehold Borough, CR 522 becomes municipally maintained Thockmorton Street, which turns southeast into residential areas. At the Monmouth Avenue intersection, the road heads into the commercial downtown of Freehold, where CR 522 ends at CR 537.

History

The Freehold and Englishtown Turnpike was chartered in 1863 to run from Freehold to Englishtown. On June 12, 1901, all of the turnpike between Broad Street, Freehold and Main Street (CR 527), Englishtown was purchased by the Monmouth County Board of Chosen Freeholders and incorporated into the county highway system.

Between US 1 and US 130, CR 522 formerly followed Ridge Road. The new alignment between US 1 and US 130 was fully opened by 2001. The county road had also once extended west to Route 27 in Kingston via Ridge Road and Heathcote Road.

Major intersections

See also

References

External links

NJ State Highways: CR 515-530
CR 522 pictures

522
522
522